The 1991 Big West Conference men's basketball tournament was held March 8–10 at the Long Beach Arena in Long Beach, California.

Defending national and conference champions  defeated seventh-seeded  in the final, 98–74, capturing their seventh PCAA/Big West championship. This was the Runnin' Rebels' seventh title in their nine seasons in the Big West.

UNLV subsequently received an automatic bid to the 1991 NCAA tournament, where they would advance to the Final Four. Fellow Big West member New Mexico State received an at-large bid.

Format
After three seasons as a ten-team tournament, the Big West reverted to the eight-team format that it used prior to the 1988 season. In turn, only the top eight teams, based on regular season conference records, qualified for the tournament field. The two teams with the worst records were excluded.

All eight teams were entered in the initial round, paired and seeded based on record.

Bracket

References

Big West Conference men's basketball tournament
1990–91 Big West Conference men's basketball season
Big West Conference men's basketball tournament
Big West Conference men's basketball tournament